Aethes kasyi is a species of moth of the family Tortricidae. It was described by Razowski in 1962. It is found on Sicily and Cyprus and in Italy, Bulgaria, North Macedonia, Ukraine and Iran.

Adults are on wing in March and from May to June and in September.

References

kasyi
Moths described in 1962
Moths of Europe
Moths of Asia
Taxa named by Józef Razowski